Vallichira  is a village in Kottayam district in the state of Kerala, India.

Demographics
 India census, Vallichira had a population of 13455 with 6769 males and 6686 females.

Towns

Palai
vallichira
marangattupally
Kuravilangad
Kottayam

Villages

Valavoor
Palackattumala
Padinjattinkara
Puliyanoor

References

Villages in Kottayam district